Takhtshah-e Pain (also Romanized as Takhtshah-e Pā’īn; also known as Shakheh-ye Pā’īn) is a village in Hoseyniyeh Rural District, Alvar-e Garmsiri District, Andimeshk County, Khuzestan Province, Iran. At the 2006 census, its population was 25, in 7 families.

References 

Populated places in Andimeshk County